The list of marine crustaceans of South Africa is a list of saltwater species that form a part of the crustacean (Phylum Arthropoda, several classes) fauna of South Africa. This list does not include the freshwater and terrestrial crustaceans. The list follows the SANBI listing on iNaturalist, and does not always agree with WoRMS for distribution.

Class Branchiopoda, subclass Diplostraca, infraclass Cladoceromorpha

Superorder Cladocera, order Ctenopoda

family Sididae
Penilia spp.

Superorder Cladocera, order Onychopoda

Family Podonidae
Evadne spp.					
Podon spp.

Class Branchiopoda, subclass Sarsostraca

Order Anostraca

Family Artemiidae
Artemiidae spp.

Superclass Multicrustacea, class Hexanauplia, subclass Copepoda, infraclass Neocopepoda

Superorder Gymnoplea, order Calanoida

Family Acartiidae

Paracartia africana (Steuer, 1915)
Acartia spp.

Family Calanidae
Calanoides carinatus (Krøyer, 1849)
Calanus agulhensis De Decker, Kaczmaruk & Marska, 1991
Calanus spp.

Family Candaciidae
Candacia bipinnata (Giesbrecht, 1889)
Candacia spp.

Family Centropagidae
Centropages brachiatus (Dana, 1849) – Pelagic copepods
Centropages spp.

Family Clausocalanidae
Clausocalanus furcatus (Brady, 1883)
Clausocalanus ingens Frost & Fleminger, 1968
Ctenocalanus vanus Giesbrecht, 1888

Family Eucalanidae
Eucalanus elongatus elongatus (Dana, 1848)
Eucalanus spp.

Family Euchaetidae
Euchaeta marina (Prestandrea, 1833)
Euchaeta spp.

Family Metridinidae
Metridia lucens Boeck, 1865
Metridia spp.
Pleuromamma abdominalis (Lubbock, 1856)
Pleuromamma spp.

Family Paracalanidae
Paracalanus parvus parvus (Claus, 1863)
Paracalanus spp.

Family Rhincalanidae
Rhincalanus nasutus Giesbrecht, 1888
Rhincalanus spp.

Family Subeucalanidae
Subeucalanus mucronatus (Giesbrecht, 1888)

Superorder Podoplea, order Harpacticoida

Family Ectinosomatidae
Microsetella spp. - Benthic copepods

Family Porcellidiidae
Porcellidium spp. – Benthic copepods

Superorder Podoplea, order Cyclopoida

Family Oithonidae
Oithona spp.

Superorder Podoplea, order Harpacticoida, suborder Poecilostomatoida

Family Corycaeidae
Corycaeus spp.

Family Oncaeidae
Oncaea spp.

Family Sapphirinidae
Sapphirina spp. – Glitter-bugs

Subclass Thecostraca, infraclass Cirripedia

Superorder Thoracica, order Lepadiformes, suborder Lepadomorpha

Family Lepadidae
Conchoderma auritum (Linnaeus, 1767) – Rabbit ear barnacle
Conchoderma virgatum Spengler, 1789
Dosima fascicularis (Ellis & Solander, 1786) – Buoy barnacle
Lepas (Anatifa) anatifera Linnaeus, 1758 – Yellow-rimmed goose barnacle
Lepas (Anatifa) anserifera Linnaeus, 1767 – Goose barnacle
Lepas (Anatifa) australis Darwin, 1851 – Goose barnacle
Lepas (Anatifa) hillii Leach, 1818 – Goose barnacle
Lepas (Anatifa) pectinata Spengler, 1793 – Goose barnacle
Lepas (Anatifa) testudinata Aurivillius, 1892 – Goose barnacle

Family Poecilasmatidae
Megalasma minus Annandale, 1906
Octolasmis cor (Aurivillius, 1892)
Octolasmis neptuni (MacDonald, 1869)
Octolasmis tridens 
Octolasmis warwickii Gray, 1825
Octolasmis weberi (Hoek, 1907)
Poecilasma aurantia Darwin, 1852 
Poecilasma crassa (Gray, 1848) – Crab barnacle
Poecilasma kaempferi Darwin, 1852

Order Scalpelliformes

Family Calanticidae
Calantica pollicipedoides (Hoek, 1907)
Smilium hypocrites Barnard, 1924

Family Scalpellidae, subfamily Arcoscalpellinae
Arcoscalpellum botellinae (Barnard, 1924)
Arcoscalpellum michelottianum (Seguenza, 1876)
Catherinum sinuatum (Pilsbry, 1907)
Pilsbryiscalpellum capense (Barnard, 1924)
Pilsbryiscalpellum subalatum (Barnard, 1824)
Tarasovium brevicaulus (Barnard, 1924)
Tarasovium eumitos (Barnard, 1924)
Tarasovium natalense (Barnard, 1924)
Tarasovium valvulifer (Annandale, 1910)
Vertebroscalpellum micrum (Pilsbry, 1907)
Verum agulhense (Barnard, 1924)
Verum branchiumcancri (Weltner, 1922)
Verum cancellatum (Barnard, 1924)
Verum carinatum (Hoek, 1883)
Verum porcellanum (Barnard, 1924)

Subfamily Meroscalpellinae
Annandaleum gruvelii subsp. gruvelii (Annandale, 1906)

Subfamily Scalpellinae
Compressoscalpellum faurei (Barnard, 1924)
Ornatoscalpellum ornatum (Gray, 1848)

Lithotryidae
Lithotrya valentiana (Gray, 1825)

Order Sessilia, suborder Balanomorpha

Superfamily Balanoidea, family Archaeobalanidae, subfamily Acastinae
Acasta alba Barnard, 1924
Acasta cyathus Darwin, 1854
Acasta spongites (Poli, 1791)
Acasta sulcata Lamarck, 1818
Archiacasta membranacea (Barnard, 1924)

Subfamily Archaeobalaninae
Chirona tenuis (Hoek, 1883)
Membranobalanus orcutti (Pilsbry, 1907)
Neoacasta fossata (Barnard, 1924)
Pectinoacasta pectinipes (Pilsbry, 1912)
Solidobalanus elizabethae (Barnard, 1924)	Biccard

Family Balanidae, subfamily Balaninae
Amphibalanus amphitrite  – Striped barnacle
Amphibalanus poecilotheca (Krüger, 1911)	Biccard		
Amphibalanus venustus (Darwin, 1854) – Striped barnacle
Balanus glandula Darwin, 1854 – Pacific barnacle
Balanus scandens Pilsbry
Balanus spongicola Brown, 1844
Balanus trigonus Darwin, 1854
Balanus venustus Darwin, 1854

Subfamily Megabalaninae
Austromegabalanus cylindricus (Gmelin, 1780) – Giant barnacle
Megabalanus tintinnabulum (Linnaeus, 1758)
Notomegabalanus algicola Pilsbry, 1916 – White dwarf barnacle

Family Pyrgomatidae, subfamily Pyrgomatinae
Cantellius sp.

Superfamily Chthamaloidea, family Chthamalidae, subfamily Chthamalinae
Chthamalus dentatus Krauss, 1848 – Toothed barnacle

Subfamily Notochthamalinae
Octomeris angulosa (Sowerby, 1825) – Eight shell barnacle

Superfamily Coronuloidea, family Chelonibiidae, subfamily Chelonibiinae
Chelonibia caretta (Spengler, 1790)
Chelonibia testudinaria (Linnaeus, 1758)

Family Coronulidae Subfamily Coronulinae
Cetopirus complanatus (Mörch, 1852)
Coronula diadema (Linnaeus, 1767) – Whale barnacle
Coronula reginae Darwin, 1854
Xenobalanus globicipitis Steenstrup, 1851

Superfamily Tetraclitoidea, family Tetraclitidae, subfamily Tetraclitinae
Tetraclita rufotincta (Bruguière, 1789) – Rosy volcano barnacle
Tetraclita serrata Darwin, 1954 – Grey volcano barnacle

Class Malacostraca, subclass Eumalacostraca

Superorder Peracarida, order Amphipoda, suborder Amphilochidea, infraorder Amphilochida, parvorder Amphilochidira

Superfamily Amphilochoidea, family Amphilochidae
Amphilochus neapolitanus Della Valle, 1893
Hourstonius pusilla (K.H. Barnard, 1916)
Rostrogitanopsis mariae (Griffiths, 1973)

Superfamily Amphilochoidea, family Bolttsiidae
Bolttsia minuta Griffiths, 1976

Superfamily Amphilochoidea, family Cyproideidae
Cyproidea ornata Haswell, 1879 – Ornate amphipod
Hoplopleon australis (K.H. Barnard, 1916)
Hoplopleon medusarum K.H. Barnard, 1932
Hoplopleon similis Schellenberg, 1953
Unguja yaya Griffiths, 1976

Superfamily Amphilochoidea, family Sebidae, subfamily Sebinae
Seba saundersii Stebbing, 1875

Superfamily Amphilochoidea, family Stenothoidae, subfamily Stenothoinae
Knysmetopa grandimana (Griffiths, 1974)
Probolisca ovata (Stebbing, 1888)
Proboloides rotunda (Stebbing, 1917)
Stenothoe adhaerens Stebbing, 1888
Stenothoe dolichopous K.H. Barnard, 1916
Stenothoe gallensis Walker, 1904
Stenothoe valida Dana, 1852

Superfamily Iphimedioidea, family Amathillopsidae, subfamily Cleonardopsinae
Cleonardopsis carinata K.H. Barnard, 1916

Superfamily Iphimedioidea, family Dikwidae
Dikwa acrania Griffiths, 1974

Superfamily Iphimedioidea, family Epimeriidae
Epimeria cornigera (Fabricius, 1779)
Epimeria longispinosa K.H. Barnard, 1916
Epimeria semiarmata K.H. Barnard, 1916

Superfamily Iphimedioidea, family Ochlesidae
Ochlesis lenticulosus K.H. Barnard, 1940 – Ridgeback amphipod
Ochlesis levetzowi Schellenberg, 1953

Superfamily Iphimediidae, family Iphimediidae
Iphimedia capicola K.H. Barnard, 1932
Iphimedia excisa (K.H. Barnard, 1932)
Iphimedia gibba (K.H. Barnard, 1955) – Hunchback amphipod
Iphimedia stegosaura (Griffiths, 1975)

Superfamily Leucothoidea, family Leucothoidae
Leucothoe ctenochir K.H. Barnard, 1925 
Leucothoe dolichoceras K.H. Barnard, 1916 
Leucothoe euryonyx (Walker, 1901)
Leucothoe richiardii Lesson, 1865
Leucothoe spinicarpa (Abildgaard, 1789) – Sponge amphipod

Superorder Peracarida, order Amphipoda, suborder Amphilochidea, infraorder Amphilochida, parvorder Eusiridira

Superfamily Eusiroidea, family Eusiridae
Eusirus minutus Sars, 1895
Rhachotropis grimaldi (Chevreux, 1887)
Rhachotropis kergueleni Stebbing, 1888
Rhachotropis paeneglaber K.H. Barnard, 1916
Rhachotropis palporum Stebbing, 1908

Superfamily Liljeborgioidea, family Liljeborgiidae, subfamily Idunellinae
Idunella lindae (Griffiths, 1974)
Idunella saldanha (Griffiths, 1975)
Idunella sinuosa (Griffiths, 1974)

Superfamily Liljeborgioidea, family Liljeborgiidae, Subfamily Liljeborgiinae
Liljeborgia consanguinea Stebbing, 1888
Liljeborgia epistomata K.H. Barnard, 1932
Liljeborgia dubia (Haswell, 1880)
Liljeborgia kinahani (Bate, 1862)
Liljeborgia palmata Griffiths, 1974
Liljeborgia proxima Chevreux, 1907

Superorder Peracarida, order Amphipoda, suborder Amphilochidea, infraorder Amphilochida, parvorder Oedicerotidira

Superfamily Oedicerotoidea, family Oedicerotidae
Halicreion ovalitelson K.H. Barnard, 1916
Monoculodopsis longimana Ledoyer, 1973
Oediceroides cinderella Stebbing, 1888 
Perioculodes longimanus (Bate & Westwood, 1868)
Perioculodes pallidus Griffiths, 1975
Synchelidium tenuimanum Norman, 1895
Westwoodilla manta Griffiths, 1974

Superorder Peracarida, order Amphipoda, suborder Amphilochidea, infraorder Lysianassida, Parvorder Haustoriidira

Superfamily Haustorioidea, family Phoxocephalidae, subfamily Brolginae
Paraphoxus oculatus (Sars, 1879)

Superfamily Haustorioidea, family Phoxocephalidae, subfamily Harpiniinae
Basuto stimpsoni (Stebbing, 1908)
Heterophoxus cephalodens Griffiths, 1975
Heterophoxus opus Griffiths, 1975
Pseudharpinia excavata (Chevreux, 1887)

Superfamily Haustorioidea, family Phoxocephalidae, subfamily Pontharpiniinae
Griffithsius latipes (Griffiths, 1976) – Spade-foot amphipod

Superfamily Haustorioidea, family Platyischnopidae
Indischnopus capensis (K.H. Barnard, 1926)

Superfamily Haustorioidea, family Urothoidae
Cunicus profundus Griffiths, 1974
Urothoe coxalis Griffiths, 1974
Urothoe elegans (Bate, 1857)
Urothoe grimaldii Chevreux, 1895 – Burrowing amphipod
Urothoe pinnata K.H. Barnard, 1955
Urothoe platypoda Griffiths, 1974
Urothoe pulchella (Costa, 1853)
Urothoe serrulidactylus K.H Barnard, 1955
Urothoe tumorosa Griffiths, 1974

Superorder Peracarida, order Amphipoda, suborder Amphilochidea, infraorder Lysianassida, Parvorder Lysianassidira

Superfamily Aristioidea, family Aristiidae
Aristias symbioticus K.H. Barnard, 1916

Superfamily Aristioidea, family Izinkalidae
Izinkala fihla Griffiths, 1977

Superfamily Aristioidea, family Trischizostomatidae
Trischizostoma paucispinosum K.H. Barnard, 1916
Trischizostoma remipes Stebbing, 1908
Trischizostoma serratum K.H. Barnard, 1925

Superfamily Aristioidea, subfamily Wandinidae
Pseudocyphocaris coxalis Ledoyer, 1986

Superfamily Lysianassoidea, family Acidostomatidae
Acidostoma obesum (Bate & Westwood, 1861)

Superfamily Lysianassoidea, family Amaryllididae, subfamily Amaryllidinae
Amaryllis macrophthalma Haswell, 1879 – Pocket amphipod

Superfamily Lysianassoidea, family Amaryllididae, subfamily Vijayiinae
Devo conocephala (K.H. Barnard, 1925)

Superfamily Lysianassoidea, family Cyphocarididae
Cyphocaris anonyx Boeck, 1871
Cyphocaris challengeri Stebbing, 1888
Cyphocaris faurei K.H. Barnard, 1916
Cyphocaris richardi Chevreux, 1905

Superfamily Lysianassoidea, family Eurytheneidae
Eurythenes obesus (Chevreux, 1905)

Superfamily Lysianassoidea, family Lysianassidae, subfamily Conicostomatinae
Scolopostoma prionoplax (Monod, 1937)
Stomacontion capense K.H. Barnard, 1916

Superfamily Lysianassoidea, family Lysianassidae, subfamily Lysianassinae
Lysianassa ceratina (Walker, 1889) – Compact amphipod
Lysianassa minimus (Schellenberg 1953) Not in WoRMS
Phoxostoma algoense K.H. Barnard, 1926
Phoxostoma variegatus (Stimpson, 1856)
Socarnes filicornis (Heller, 1866)
Socarnes septimus Griffiths, 1975

Superfamily Lysianassoidea, family Tryphosidae
Hippomedon longimanus Stebbing, 1888
Hippomedon normalis (K.H. Barnard, 1955)
Hippomedon onconotus (Stebbing, 1908)
Lepidepecreum clypeatum Chevreux, 1888
Lepidepecreum clypodentatum J.L. Barnard, 1962
Lepidepecreum twalae Griffiths, 1974
Microlysias xenokeras Stebbing, 1918
Orchomene plicatus (Schellenberg, 1926)
Schisturella adversicola (K.H. Barnard, 1926)

Superfamily Lysianassoidea, family Uristidae
Euonyx conicurus K.H. Barnard, 1955
Ichnopus macrobetomma Stebbing, 1917
Ichnopus taurus Costa, 1853
Stephonyx biscayensis (Chevreux, 1908)
Uristes natalensis K.H. Barnard, 1916
Uristes sulcus Griffiths, 1974

Superfamily Stegocephaloidea, family Stegocephalidae
Austrocephaloides australis (K.H. Barnard, 1916)

Superfamily Stegocephaloidea, family Stegocephalidae, subfamily Parandaniinae
Parandania boecki (Stebbing, 1888)

Superfamily Stegocephaloidea, family Stegocephalidae, subfamily Stegocephalinae
Stegocephaloides attingens Barnard, 1932

Superorder Peracarida, order Amphipoda, suborder Amphilochidea, infraorder Lysianassida, Parvorder Synopiidira

Superfamily Dexaminoidea, family Atylidae, subfamily Nototropiinae
Nototropis granulosus (Walker, 1904)
Nototropis guttatus Costa, 1853
Nototropis homochir (Haswell, 1885)
Nototropis swammerdamei (Milne-Edwards, 1830)

Superfamily Dexaminoidea, family Dexaminidae, subfamily Dexamininae
Dexamine spiniventris (Costa, 1853)
Paradexamine pacifica (Thomson, 1879)

Superfamily Dexaminoidea, family Lepechinellidae
Lepechinella occlo J.L. Barnard, 1973

Superfamily Dexaminoidea, family Dexaminidae, subfamily Polycheriinae
Polycheria atolli Walker, 1905 – Sea squirt amphipod

Superfamily Dexaminoidea, family Dexaminidae, subfamily Prophliantinae
Guernea (Guernea) rhomba Griffiths, 1974
Guernea (Guernea) tumulosa Griffiths, 1976

Superfamily Dexaminoidea, family Pardaliscidae
Halicoides anacantha (K.H. Barnard, 1926)
Nicippe tumida Bruzelius, 1859
Nicippe spp.

Superfamily Synopioidea, family Ampeliscidae
Ampelisca acris Griffiths, 1974
Ampelisca anisuropa (Stebbing, 1908)
Ampelisca anomala Sars, 1883
Ampelisca brachyceras Walker, 1904
Ampelisca brevicornis (Costa, 1853)
Ampelisca chiltoni Stebbing, 1888 
Ampelisca diadema (Costa, 1853)
Ampelisca excavata K.H. Barnard, 1926
Ampelisca fusca Stebbing, 1888
Ampelisca insignis (K.H. Barnard, 1916)
Ampelisca miops K.H. Barnard, 1916
Ampelisca natalensis K.H. Barnard, 1916
Ampelisca palmata K.H. Barnard, 1916 – Four-eyed amphipod
Ampelisca spinimana Chevreux, 1900
Byblis gaimardii (Kröyer, 1846)

Superfamily Synopioidea, family Argissidae
Argissa hamatipes (Norman, 1869)

Superfamily Synopioidea, family Synopiidae
Tiron australis Stebbing, 1908

Superorder Peracarida, order Amphipoda, suborder Colomastigidea, infraorder Colomastigida, parvorder Colomastigidira

Superfamily Colomastigoidea, family Colomastigidae
Colomastix armata Ledoyer, 1979
Colomastix keiskama Griffiths, 1974
Colomastix plumosa Ledoyer, 1979
Colomastix pusilla Grube, 1861
Yulumara improvisa Griffiths, 1976

Superorder Peracarida, order Amphipoda, suborder Hyperiidea, infraorder Physocephalata, parvorder Physocephalatidira

Superfamily Phronimoidea, family Hyperiidae
Themisto gaudichaudii Guérin, 1825 – Bubble-eyed amphipod

Superfamily Phronimoidea, family Phronimidae
Phronima sedentaria (Forskål, 1775) – Pram-bug isopod

Superorder Peracarida, order Amphipoda, suborder Senticaudata, infraorder Bogidiellida, parvorder Bogidiellidira

Superfamily Bogidielloidea, family Bogidiellidae
Bollegidia capensis Ruffo, 1974

Superorder Peracarida, order Amphipoda, suborder Senticaudata, infraorder Corophiida , parvorder Caprellidira

Superfamily Caprelloidea, family Caprellidae, subfamily Caprellinae
Caprella circur Mayer, 1903
Caprella danilevski Czerniavskii, 1868
Caprella equilibra Say, 1818 Skeleton shrimp
Caprella laevipes Mayer, 1903
Caprella natalensis Mayer, 1903
Caprella penantis Leach, 1814
Caprella scaura Templeton, 1836
Caprella triodos Stebbing, 1910
Eupariambus fallax K.H. Barnard, 1957
Hemiaegina minuta Mayer, 1890
Metaprotella haswelliana (Mayer, 1882)
Metaprotella macrodactylos Stebbing, 1910
Monoliropus falcimanus Mayer, 1904
Orthoprotella mayeri K.H. Barnard, 1916
Paracaprella pusilla Mayer, 1890
Paracaprella tenuis Mayer, 1903
Paradeutella serrata Mayer, 1903
Pseudaeginella tristanensis (Stebbing, 1888)
Pseudoprotella phasma Montagu, 1804

Superfamily Caprelloidea, family Caprellidae, subfamily Phtisicinae
Caprellina longicollis Nicolet, 1849
Caprellina spiniger K.H. Barnard, 1916
Chaka leoni Griffiths, 1974
Metaproto novaehollandiae (Haswell, 1880)
Phtisica marina Slabber, 1769

Superfamily Caprelloidea, family Cyamidae
Cyamus balaenopterae K.H. Barnard, 1931
Cyamus boopis Lütken, 1870 Whale louse
Cyamus erraticus Roussel de Vauzème, 1834
Cyamus gracilis Roussel de Vauzème, 1834
Cyamus ovalis Roussel de Vauzème, 1834
Isocyamus delphinii (Guérin-Méneville, 1836)
Neocyamus physeteris (Pouchet, 1888)
Syncyamus aequus Lincoln & Hurley, 1981

Superfamily Caprelloidea, family Podoceridae
Laetmatophilus durbanensis K.H. Barnard, 1916
Laetmatophilus purus Stebbing, 1888
Laetmatophilus tridens Barnard, 1916
Podocerus africanus K.H. Barnard, 1916
Podocerus hystrix Stebbing, 1910
Podocerus inconspicuus (Stebbing, 1888)
Podocerus multispinis K.H. Barnard, 1926
Podocerus pyurae Griffiths, 1975

Superfamily Microprotopoidea, family Neomegamphopidae
Pseudomegamphopus jassopsis (K.H. Barnard, 1951)

Superfamily Photoidea, family Ischyroceridae, subfamily Ischyrocerinae, tribe Ischyrocerini
Isaeopsis tenax K.H. Barnard, 1916
Ischyrocerus anguipes Krøyer, 1838
Ischyrocerus carinatus K.H. Barnard, 1916
Ischyrocerus ctenophorus Schellenberg, 1953
Ischyrocerus gorgoniae K.H. Barnard, 1940
Jassa falcata (Montagu, 1808) – Hitchhiker amphipods
Jassa marmorata Holmes, 1905 – Hitchhiker amphipods
Jassa morinoi Conlan, 1990 – Hitchhiker amphipods
Jassa slatteryi Conlan, 1990 – Hitchhiker amphipods
Parajassa chikoa Griffiths, 1974
Ventojassa frequens (Chilton, 1883)

Superfamily Photoidea, family Ischyroceridae, subfamily Ischyrocerinae, tribe Siphonoecetini
Africoecetes armatus (Griffiths, 1974)
Cerapus tubularis Say, 1817
Concholestes armatus Griffiths, 1974
Ericthonius ledoyeri Barnard & Karaman, 1991
Ericthonius punctatus (Bate, 1857)
Notopoma africana Lowry & Berents, 1996
Siphonoecetes (Centraloecetes) dellavallei Stebbing, 1899 – Jumping sand?
Siphonoecetes (Orientoecetes) orientalis Walker, 1904 – Jumping sand?

Superfamily Photoidea, family Kamakidae, subfamily Aorchinae
Aorcho delgadus J.L. Barnard, 1961

Superfamily Photoidea, family Kamakidae, subfamily Kamakinae
Aorchoides crenatipalma (K.H. Barnard, 1916)

Superfamily Photoidea, family Photidae
Gammaropsis chelifera (Chevreux, 1901)
Gammaropsis holmesi (Stebbing, 1908)
Gammaropsis longicarpa Reid, 1951
Gammaropsis palmoides (K.H. Barnard, 1932)
Gammaropsis pseudodenticulata Ledoyer, 1979
Gammaropsis scissimana (K.H. Barnard, 1926)
Gammaropsis sophiae (Boeck, 1861)
Latigammaropsis afra (Stebbing, 1888)
Latigammaropsis atlantica (Stebbing, 1888)
Photis dolichommata Stebbing, 1910
Photis kapapa J.L. Barnard, 1970
Photis longidactyla Griffiths, 1974
Photis longimana Walker, 1904
Photis uncinata K.H. Barnard, 1932

Superorder Peracarida, order Amphipoda, suborder Senticaudata, infraorder Corophiida , parvorder Corophiidira

Superfamily Aoroidea, family Aoridae
Aora anomala Schellenberg, 1926
Aora gibbula K.H. Barnard, 1932
Aora inflata Griffiths, 1976
Aora kergueleni Stebbing, 1888
Autonoe hirsutipes (Stebbing, 1895)
Bemlos teleporus (K.H. Barnard, 1955)
Camacho bathyplous Stebbing, 1888
Grandidierella bonnieroides Stephensen, 1947
Grandidierella chelata K.H. Barnard, 1951
Grandidierella lignorum K.H. Barnard, 1935
Grandidierella lutosa K.H. Barnard, 1952
Grandidierella nyala (Griffiths, 1974)
Lemboides acanthiger K.H. Barnard, 1916
Lemboides afer Stebbing, 1895
Lembos hypacanthus K.H. Barnard, 1916
Microdeutopus thumbellinus Griffiths, 1974
Xenocheira leptocheira (Walker, 1909)

Superfamily Aoroidea, family Unciolidae, subfamily, Unciolinae
Janice spinidactyla Griffiths, 1973
Unciolella foveolata Barnard, 1955
Unciolella spinosa Griffiths, 1974

Superfamily Cheluroidea, family Cheluridae
Chelura terebrans Philippi, 1839

Superfamily Chevalioidea, family Chevaliidae
Chevalia aviculae Walker, 1904

Superfamily Corophioidea, family Ampithoidae, subfamily Ampithoinae
Ampithoe africana K.H. Barnard, 1926
Amphithoe falsa (K.H. Barnard, 1932)
Ampithoe kava Myers, 1985
Ampithoe ramondi Audouin, 1826
Cymadusa cavimana (Sivaprakasam, 1970)
Cymadusa filosa Savigny, 1816 – Nesting amphipod
Exampithoe (Exampithoe) natalensis K.H. Barnard, 1925
Macropisthopus stebbingi K.H. Barnard, 1916
Paragrubia vorax Chevreux, 1901
Peramphithoe humeralis (Stimpson, 1864)

Superfamily Corophioidea, family Corophiidae, subfamily Corophiinae, tribe Corophiini
Americorophium triaeonyx (Stebbing, 1904)
Monocorophium acherusicum (Costa, 1853) – Fat-feeler amphipod

Superfamily Corophioidea, family Corophiidae, subfamily Protomedeiinae
Cheiriphotis durbanensis K.H. Barnard, 1916
Cheiriphotis megacheles (Giles, 1885)

Superorder Peracarida, order Amphipoda, suborder Senticaudata, infraorder Gammarida, parvorder Crangonyctidira

Superfamily Crangonyctoidea, family Paramelitidae
Aquadulcaris andronyx (Stewart & Griffiths, 1992)
Aquadulcaris auricularius (K.H. Barnard, 1916)
Aquadulcaris crassicornis (K.H. Barnard, 1916)
Aquadulcaris dentata (Stewart & Griffiths, 1992)
Aquadulcaris marunuguis (Stewart & Griffiths, 1992)
Aquadulcaris pheronyx (Stewart & Griffiths, 1992)
Mathamelita aequidentata Stewart & Griffiths, 1995
Paramelita aurantius (K.H. Barnard, 1927)
Paramelita barnardi Thurston, 1973
Paramelita capensis (K.H. Barnard, 1916)
Paramelita flexa Griffiths, 1981
Paramelita granulicornis (K.H. Barnard, 1927)
Paramelita kogelensis (K.H. Barnard, 1927)
Paramelita magna Stewart & Griffiths, 1992
Paramelita magnicornis Stewart & Griffiths, 1992
Paramelita nigroculus (K.H. Barnard, 1916)
Paramelita odontophora Stewart, Snaddon & Griffiths, 1994
Paramelita parva Stewart & Griffiths, 1992
Paramelita pillicornis Stewart & Griffiths, 1992
Paramelita pinnicornis Stewart & Griffiths, 1992
Paramelita platypus Stewart & Griffiths, 1992
Paramelita seticornis (K.H. Barnard, 1927)
Paramelita spinicornis (K.H. Barnard, 1927)
Paramelita triangula Griffiths & Stewart, 1996
Paramelita tulbaghensis (K.H. Barnard, 1927)
Paramelita validicornis Stewart & Griffiths, 1992

Superorder Peracarida, order Amphipoda, suborder Senticaudata, infraorder Gammarida, parvorder Gammaridira

Superfamily Gammaroidea, family Bathyporeiidae
Bathyporeia cunctator d'Udekem d'Acoz & Vader, 2005
Bathyporeia gladiura d'Udekem d'Acoz & Vader, 2005
Bathyporeia griffithsi d'Udekem d'Acoz & Vader, 2005

Superorder Peracarida, order Amphipoda, suborder Senticaudata, infraorder Hadziida, parvorder Hadziidira

Superfamily Calliopioidea, family Calliopiidae
Calliopiella michaelseni Schellenberg, 1925
Membrilopus membrisetatus (J.L. Barnard, 1961)

Superfamily Calliopioidea, family Cheirocratidae
Incratella inermis (Ledoyer, 1967)

Superfamily Calliopioidea, family Megaluropidae
Megaluropus agilis Hoeck, 1889
Megaluropus namaquaeensis Schellenberg, 1953

Superfamily Calliopioidea, family Pontogeneiidae
Dautzenbergia grandimana (Chevreux, 1900)
Eusiroides monoculoides (Haswell, 1880)
Paramoera bidentata K.H. Barnard, 1932
Paramoera capensis (Dana, 1853) – Big-eyed amphipod
Paramoerella interstitialis Ruffo, 1974

Superfamily Hadzioidea, family Eriopisidae
Eriopisella capensis (K.H. Barnard, 1916)
Eriopisella epimera Griffiths, 1974
Victoriopisa chilkensis (Chilton, 1921) 
Victoriopisa epistomata (Griffiths, 1974)

Superfamily Hadzioidea, family Maeridae
Austromaera bruzelii (Stebbing, 1888)
Austromaera mastersii (Haswell, 1879)
Ceradocus natalensis Griffiths, 1974
Ceradocus (Denticeradocus) rubromaculatus (Stimpson, 1856) – Red-striped amphipod
Elasmopoides chevreuxi Stebbing, 1908
Elasmopus alalo Myers, 1986
Elasmopus japonicus Stephensen, 1932
Elasmopus pectenicrus (Bate, 1862)
Elasmopus rapax Costa, 1853
Hamimaera hamigera (Haswell, 1879)
Jerbarnia mecochira Croker, 1971
Linguimaera boecki (Haswell, 1879)
Maera grossimana (Montagu, 1808)
Maera hirondellei Chevreux, 1900
Maera inaequipes (Costa, 1857)
Maera vagans K.H. Barnard, 1940 – nomen dubium
Mallacoota subcarinata (Haswell, 1879)
Othomaera komma (Griffiths, 1975)
Othomaera lobata (Griffiths, 1976)
Othomaera thrixa (Griffiths, 1975)
Parelasmopus suluensis (Dana, 1853)
Quadrimaera pacifica (Schellenberg, 1938)
Quadrimaera serrata (Schellenberg, 1938)
Quadrivisio aviceps (K.H. Barnard, 1940)
Zygomaera emarginata Griffiths, 1975

Superfamily Hadzioidea, family Melitidae
Abludomelita mucronata (Griffiths, 1975)
Dulichiella appendiculata (Say, 1818)
Ledoyeromelita excavata (Ledoyer, 1979)
Melita machaera K.H. Barnard, 1955
Melita orgasmos K.H. Barnard, 1940
Melita zeylanica Stebbing, 1904 – Brack-water amphipod
Verdeia subchelata (Schellenberg, 1925)

Superfamily Hadzioidea, family Nuuanuidae
Nuuanu castellana (Griffiths, 1977)

Superorder Peracarida, order Amphipoda, suborder Senticaudata, infraorder Talitrida, parvorder Talitridira

Superfamily Hyaloidea, family Dogielinotidae
Parhyalella natalensis (Stebbing, 1917)

Superfamily Hyaloidea, family Hyalidae, subfamily Hyalinae
Hyale diastoma Barnard, 1916
Hyale grandicornis Krøyer, 1845 – Seaweed amphipod
Hyale hirtipalma (Dana, 1852)
Hyale macrodactyla Stebbing, 1899
Hyale saldanha Chilton, 1912
Parhyale hawaiensis (Dana, 1853)
Protohyale (Boreohyale) maroubrae (Stebbing, 1899)
Ptilohyale plumulosus (Stimpson, 1857)

Superfamily Hyaloidea, family Phliantidae
Pereionotus alaniphlias (J.L. Barnard, 1970)
Pereionotus natalensis (K.H. Barnard, 1940)

Superfamily Hyaloidea, family Plioplateidae
Plioplateia triquetra K.H. Barnard, 1916

Superfamily Hyaloidea, family Temnophliantidae
Hystriphlias hystrix (K.H. Barnard, 1954)
Temnophlias capensis K.H. Barnard, 1916 – Louse amphipod

Superfamily Talitroidea, family Talitridae
Africorchestia quadrispinosa (K.H. Barnard, 1916) 
Cochinorchestia notabilis (K.H. Barnard, 1935)
Eorchestia rectipalma (K.H. Barnard, 1940) 
Floresorchestia anomala (Chevreux, 1901)
Floresorchestia ancheidos (K.H. Barnard, 1916)
Orchestia dassenensis (K.H. Barnard, 1916)
Orchestia gammarellus (Pallas, 1766)
Platorchestia platensis (Krøyer, 1845)
Talitriator africana (Bate, 1862)
Talitriator calva (K.H. Barnard, 1940)
Talitriator cylindripes (K.H. Barnard, 1940)
Talitriator eastwoodae Methuen, 1913
Talitriator setosa (K.H. Barnard, 1940)
Talitroides alluaudi (Chevreux, 1896)
Talitroides topitotum (Burt, 1934)
Talorchestia australis K.H. Barnard, 1916
Talorchestia capensis (Dana, 1853) – Beach hopper

Class Malacostraca, subclass Eumalacostraca temp break

Superorder Peracarida, order Cumacea

Family Bodotriidae, subfamily Vaunthompsoniinae
Heterocuma africanum Zimmer, 1908 – Sandbank cumacean

Family Gynodiastylidae
Dicoides siphonatus Day, 1980
Gynodiastylis sulcata Day, 1980
Gynodiastylis curvirostris Day, 1980
Gynodiastylis fulgidus Day, 1980
Gynodiastylis lineata Day, 1980
Gynodiastylis profunda Day, 1980
Haliana eckloniae Day, 1980

Family Diastylidae
Dic calmani Stebbing, 1910
Dic formosae Day, 1980
Dic platytelson Day, 1980
Diastylis algoae Zimmer, 1908
Diastylis namibiae Day, 1980
Diastylis hexaceros Zimmer, 1908
Leptostylis attenuatus Day, 1980
Leptostylis gilli Day, 1980
Leptostylis faurei Day, 1980
Leptostylis macruroides Stebbing, 1912
Makrokylindrus (Adiastylis) acanthodes (Stebbing, 1912)
Makrokylindrus (Adiastylis) aculeatus Day, 1980
Makrokylindrus (Adiastylis) bicornis Day, 1980
Makrokylindrus (Adiastylis) spinifer Day, 1980
Makrokylindrus (Makrokylindrus) deinotelson Day, 1980
Makrokylindrus (Makrokylindrus) fragilis Stebbing, 1912
Makrokylindrus (Makrokylindrus) mundus Day, 1980
Vemakylindrus stebbingi Day, 1980

Superorder Eucarida, order Decapoda, suborder Dendrobranchiata

Superfamily Penaeoidea, family Aristeidae
Cerataspis spp.
Aristaeopsis edwardsiana (Johnson, 1868)
Aristaeomorpha foliacea (Risso, 1827)
Austropenaeus nitidus (Barnard, 1947)

Superfamily Penaeoidea, family Benthesicymidae
Bentheogennema intermedia (Spence Bate, 1888)
Gennadas bouvieri Kemp, 1909 	Kensley 1972
Gennadas brevirostris Bouvier, 1905
Gennadas capensis Calman, 1925
Gennadas clavicarpus de Man, 1907
Gennadas elegans (Smith, 1882)
Gennadas gilchristi Calman, 1925
Gennadas kempi Stebbing, 1914
Gennadas incertus (Balss, 1927)
Gennadas parvus Spence Bate, 1881
Gennadas scutatus Bouvier, 1906
Gennadas talismani Bouvier, 1906
Gennadas tinayrei Bouvier, 1906
Gennadas valens (Smith, 1884)

Superfamily Penaeoidea, family Solenoceridae
Gordonella villosa (Alcock & Anderson, 1894)
Hymenopenaeus triarthrus (Stebbing, 1914)
Solenocera africana Stebbing, 1917
Solenocera algoensis Barnard, 1947
Solenocera comata Stebbing, 1915
Solenocera siphonoceros

Superfamily Penaeoidea, family Penaeidae
Funchalia woodwardi Johnson, 1868
Macropetasma africana (Balss, 1913) – Surf shrimp
Metapenaeus monoceros (Fabricius, 1798) – Brown prawn
Metapenaeus stebbingi Nobili, 1904 	Kensley 1972
Metapenaeopsis andamanensis (Wood-Mason in Wood-Mason & Alcock, 1891)
Metapenaeopsis mogiensis Rathbun, 1902
Metapenaeopsis philippii (Spence Bate, 1881)
Metapenaeopsis quinquedentata (de Man, 1907)
Parapenaeopsis acclivirostris Alcock, 1905
Parapenaeus fissurus (Spence Bate, 1881)
Parapenaeus investigatoris Alcock & Anderson, 1899
Penaeopsis rectacuta (Spence Bate, 1881)
Penaeus canaliculatus (Olivier, 1811) – Striped prawn
Penaeus indicus H. Milne Edwards, 1837 – White prawn
Penaeus japonicus Spence Bate, 1888 – Bamboo prawn
Penaeus latisulcatus Kishinouye, 1896
Penaeus monodon Fabricius, 1798 – Tiger prawn
Penaeus semisulcatus De Haan, 1844 [in De Haan, 1833-1850] – Zebra prawn

Superfamily Penaeoidea, family Sicyoniidae
Sicyonia lancifer (Olivier, 1811)
Sicyonia longicauda Rathbun, 1906
Sicyonia truncata (Kubo, 1949)

Superfamily Sergestoidea, family Sergestidae
Acetes erythraeus Nobili, 1905
Acetes natalensis Barnard, 1955
Allosergestes pectinatus (Sund, 1920)
Allosergestes sargassi (Ortmann, 1893)
Deosergestes corniculum (Krøyer, 1855)
Deosergestes disjunctus (Burkenroad, 1940)
Eusergestes arcticus (Krøyer, 1855)
Neosergestes orientalis (Hansen, 1919)
Parasergestes armatus (Krøyer, 1855)
Petalidium foliaceum Spence Bate, 1881
Sergestes atlanticus H. Milne Edwards, 1830
Sergia grandis (Sund, 1920)
Sergia laminata (Burkenroad, 1940)
Sergia potens (Burkenroad, 1940)
Sergia prehensilis (Spence Bate, 1881)
Sergia regalis (Gordon, 1939)
Sergia scintillans (Burkenroad, 1940)
Sergia talismani (Barnard, 1947)

Superfamily Sergestoidea, family Luciferidae
Lucifer chacei Bowman, 1967
Lucifer orientalis Hansen, 1919
Lucifer penicillifer Hansen, 1919
Lucifer typus H. Milne Edwards, 1837 [in H. Milne Edwards, 1834-1840]

Superorder Eucarida, order Decapoda, suborder Pleocyemata, infraorder Achelata

Family Palinuridae
Jasus lalandii (H. Milne Edwards, 1837) - West coast rock lobster
Palinurus delagoae Barnard, 1926 - South coast rock lobster
Palinurus gilchristi Stebbing, 1900 - Natal deep-sea rock lobster
Panulirus homarus (Linnaeus, 1758) - East coast rock lobster
Panulirus longipes (A. Milne Edwards, 1868) - Longlegged spiny lobster
Panulirus ornatus (Fabricius, 1798) - Ornate spiny lobster
Panulirus penicillatus (Olivier, 1791) - Pencillate spiny lobster
Panulirus versicolor (Latreille, 1804) - Painted spiny lobster

Family Scyllaridae, subfamily Arctidinae
Scyllarides elisabethae (Ortmann, 1894) - Shoveller crayfish

Superorder Eucarida, order Decapoda, suborder Pleocyemata, infraorder Astacidea

Superfamily Enoplometopoidea, family Enoplometopidae
Enoplometopus holthuisi Gordon, 1968 – Reef lobster

Superorder Eucarida, order Decapoda, suborder Pleocyemata, infraorder Anomura

Superfamily Hippoidea, family Hippidae
Emerita austroafricana Schmitt, 1937 - Mole crab
Hippa adactyla Fabricius, 1787 - Mole crab

Superfamily Galatheoidea, family Porcellanidae
Neopetrolisthes maculatus (H. Milne Edwards, 1837) - Spotted porcelain crab
Pachycheles natalensis (Krauss, 1843)
Petrolisthes lamarckii (Leach, 1820) - Lamarck's porcelain crab
Pisidia dehaanii (Krauss, 1843)<ref name="2 Oceans 2010" /
Pisidia streptocheles (Stimpson, 1858)

Superfamily Paguroidea, family Coenobitidae
Coenobita cavipes Stimpson, 1858 - Common land hermit crab

Superfamily Paguroidea, family Diogenidae
Aniculus aniculus (Fabricius, 1787) - Teddy bear hermit crabs
Calcinus laevimanus (Randall, 1840) - Blue-eyed hermit crab
Clibanarius longitarsus (De Haan, 1849) - Long-fingered hermit crab
Clibanarius virescens (Krauss, 1843) - Yellow banded hermit crab
Dardanus arrosor (Herbst, 1796) - Striated hermit
Dardanus megistos (Herbst, 1804) - Giant spotted hermit crab
Dardanus pedunculatus (Herbst, 1804) - Anemone hermit crab
Diogenes brevirostris Stimpson, 1858 - Common sand hermit crab
Diogenes costatus Henderson, 1893
Diogenes extricatus Stebbing, 1910
Diogenes senex Heller, 1865
Paguristes gamianus (H. Milne Edwards, 1836) – Pink hermit crab

Superfamily Paguroidea, family Paguridae
Pagurus liochele (Barnard, 1947) - Blue-faced hermit crab; blue striped hermit crab

Superfamily Paguroidea, family Parapaguridae
Parapagurus pilosimanus Smith, 1879 - Hairy clawed hermit crab
Sympagurus dimorphus (Studer, 1883) - Cloaked hermit crab

Superorder Eucarida, order Decapoda, suborder Pleocyemata, infraorder Axiidea

Family Callianassidae, subfamily Callichirinae
Callichirus kraussi (Stebbing, 1900) - Common sandprawn

Family Callianassidae, subfamily Callianassinae
Pestarella rotundicaudata (Stebbing, 1902) – Round-tailed sandprawn

Superorder Eucarida, order Decapoda, suborder Pleocyemata, infraorder Brachyura, section Eubrachyura, subsection Heterotremata

Superfamily Calappoidea, family Calappidae
Ashtoret lunaris (Forskål, 1775) – Moon crab
Calappa hepatica (Linnaeus, 1758) – Reef box crab
Mursia cristiata H. Milne Edwards, 1837 – Masked crab

Superfamily Eriphioidea, family Eriphiidae
Eriphia smithii MacLeay, 1838 – Smith's xanthid
Eriphia sebana (Shaw & Nodder, 1803) – Red-eyed xanthid
Eriphia scabricula Dana, 1852 – Hedgehog xanthid

Superfamily Hexapodoidea, family Hexapodidae
Spiroplax spiralis (Barnard, 1950) – Three-legged crab

Superfamily Hymenosomatoidea, family Hymenosomatidae
Hymenosoma orbiculare Desmarest, 1823 – Crown crab
Neorhynchoplax bovis (Barnard, 1946) – Rhynchoplax bovis Barnard, 1946

Superfamily Leucosioidea, family Leucosiidae, subfamily Ebaliinae
Afrophila punctata (Bell, 1855) – Long-legged crab

Superfamily Majoidea, family Epialtidae, subfamily Epialtinae
Acanthonyx dentatus H. Milne Edwards, 1834 – 
Acanthonyx quadridentatus Krauss, 1843 – Four-toothed decorator crab
Acanthonyx scutellatus MacLeay, 1838 – Shield decorator crab
Acanthonyx undulatus Barnard, 1947 – Shield decorator crab
Dehaanius dentatus (Milne Edwards) – Toothed decorator crab

Superfamily Majoidea, family Inachidae
Macropodia falcifera (Stimpson, 1857) – Cape long-legged spider crab
Achaeopsis spinulosus Stimpson, 1857 – Hotlips spider crab

Superfamily Majoidea, family Majidae, subfamily Majinae
Maja capensis Ortmann, 1894 – Agulhas spider crab

Superfamily Pilumnoidea, family Pilumnidae, subfamily Pilumninae
Pilumnus minutus De Haan, 1835 – Pilumnus hirsutus
Pilumnus vespertilio (Fabricius, 1793) – Shaggy xanthid
Serenepilumnus pisifer (MacLeay, 1838)

Superfamily, Portunoidea, family Portunidae, subfamily Caphyrinae
Lissocarcinus laevis Miers, 1886
Lissocarcinus orbicularis Dana, 1852 – Harlequin crab

Superfamily, Portunoidea, family Portunidae, subfamily Portuninae
Carcinus maenas (Linnaeus, 1758) – European shore crab
Portunus (Portunus) pelagicus (Linnaeus, 1758) – Blue swimming crab
Portunus (Portunus) sanguinolentus (Herbst, 1783) – Blood-spotted swimming crab
Scylla serrata (Forskål, 1775) – Mud crab

Superfamily, Portunoidea, family Portunidae, subfamily Thalamitinae
Charybdis (Charybdis) hellerii (A. Milne-Edwards, 1867) – Heller's swimming crab
Charybdis (Goniohellenus) smithii MacLeay, 1838 – Smith's swimming crab
Thalamita admete (Herbst, 1803)
Thalamita crenata Rüppell, 1830 – Scalloped swimming crab
Thalamita woodmasoni Alcock, 1899

Superfamily, Portunoidea, family Polybiidae
Ovalipes trimaculatus (De Haan, 1833) – Three-spot swimming crab

Superfamily, Portunoidea, family Thiidae, subfamily Nautilocorystinae
Nautilocorystes ocellatus (Gray, 1831) – Masked crab

Family Pseudozioidea, subfamily Pilumnoididae
Pilumnoides rubus Guinot & Macpherson, 1987 – Kelp crab

Family Trapezioidea, subfamily Tetraliidae
Tetralia glaberrima (Herbst, 1790) – Coral crab

Family Trapeziidae, subfamily Trapeziinae
Trapezia cymodoce (Herbst, 1801) – Coral crab
Trapezia guttata Rüppell, 1830 – Coral crab
Trapezia rufopunctata (Herbst, 1799) – Coral crab

Superfamily Xanthoidea, family Xanthidae, subfamily Chlorodiellinae
Cyclodius obscurus (Hombron & Jacquinot, 1846) – Nodular xanthid

Subfamily Etisinae
Etisus electra (Herbst, 1801)

Subfamily Xanthinae
Xantho hydrophilus (Herbst, 1790) – Variable xanthid

Subfamily Zosiminae
Atergatis laevigatus A. Milne-Edwards, 1865 – Chocolate crab

Eubrachyura (section); Thoracotremata (subsection)

Superfamily Grapsoidea, family Gecarcinidae
Cardisoma carnifex (Herbst, 1796) – Giant land crab

Family Grapsidae
Grapsus fourmanoiri Crosnier, 1965 – Green rock crab
Grapsus tenuicrustatus (Herbst, 1783) – Natal lightfoot crab
Metopograpsus messor (Forskål, 1775) – Estuarine rock crab
Metopograpsus thukuhar (Owen, 1839) – Estuarine rock crab
Planes major (MacLeay, 1838) – Flotsam crab
Planes minutus (Linnaeus, 1758) – Columbus' crab

Family Percnidae
Percnon planissimum (Herbst, 1804) – Flat-bodied crab

Plagusiidae
Guinusia chabrus (Linnaeus, 1758) – Cape rock crab
Plagusia squamosa (Herbst, 1790) – Tuberculate crab

Family Sesarmidae
Chiromantes eulimene (de Man, in Weber, 1897) – Marsh crab
Chiromantes ortmanni (Crosnier, 1965) – Marsh crab
Neosarmatium meinerti (de Man, 1887) – Red-clawed mangrove crab
Parasesarma catenatum (Ortmann, 1897) – Marsh crab
Perisesarma guttatum (A. Milne-Edwards, 1869) – Red-clawed mangrove crab

Family Varunidae, subfamily Cyclograpsinae
Cyclograpsus punctatus H. Milne Edwards, 1837 – Shore crab

Subfamily Varuninae
Varuna litterata (Fabricius, 1798) – Swimming rock crab

Superfamily Ocypodoidea, family Camptandriidae
Danielita edwardsii (MacLeay, 1838) – Sandflat crab
Paratylodiplax algoensis (Barnard, 1954)

Family Dotillidae
Dotilla fenestrata Hilgendorf, 1869 Army crab

Family Macrophthalmidae
Macrophthalmus (Macrophthalmus) grandidieri Milne-Edwards, 1867
Macrophthalmus (Mareotis) depressus Rüppell, 1830

Family Ocypodidae, subfamily Ocypodinae
Ocypode ceratophthalmus (Pallas, 1772) – Horn-eyed ghost crab
Ocypode cursor (Linnaeus, 1758) – West coast ghost crab
Ocypode madagascariensis Crosnier, 1965
Ocypode ryderi Kingsley, 1880 – Pink ghost crab

Subfamily Ucinae
Uca (Austruca) annulipes (H. Milne Edwards, 1837) – Pink-clawed fiddler crab					
Uca (Paraleptuca) chlorophthalmus (H. Milne Edwards, 1837) – Green-eyed fiddler crab
Uca (Cranuca) inversa (Hoffmann, 1874) – Tropical fiddler crab
Uca (Tubuca) urvillei (H. Milne Edwards, 1852) – Urville's fiddler crab
Uca (Gelasimus) vocans (Linnaeus, 1758)

Superfamily Pinnotheroidea, family Pinnotheridae, subfamily Pinnotherinae
Pinnotheres dofleini Lenz, 1914 – Pea crab

Parvorder Podotremata

Superfamily Dromioidea, Family Dromiidae,subfamily Dromiinae
Dromidia aegibotus Barnard, 1947 – Sumo crab, scrubbing brush crab
Dromidia hirsutissima (Lamarck, 1818) – Shaggy sponge crab
Dromidia unidentata (Rüppell, 1830)
Platydromia spongiosa (Stimpson, 1858) – Cryptic sponge crab
Pseudodromia latens Stimpson, 1858 – Cloaked spomge crab, furred sponge crab

Brachyura incertae sedis (section)
Chaenostoma boscii (Audouin, 1826) – Squat long-eyed crab

Superfamily Potamoidea, family Potamonautidae, subfamily Potamonautinae
Potamonautes anchietae (Brito Capello, 1871)
Potamonautes bayonianus (Brito Capello, 1864)
Potamonautes brincki (Bott, 1960)
Potamonautes calcaratus (Gordon, 1929)
Potamonautes clarus Gouws, Stewart & Coke, 2000
Potamonautes dentatus Stewart, Coke & Cook, 1995
Potamonautes depressus (Krauss, 1843)
Potamonautes dubius (Brito Capello, 1864)
Potamonautes granularis Daniels, Stewart & Gibbons, 1998
Potamonautes kensleyi Cumberlidge & Tavares, 2006
Potamonautes lividus Gouws, Stewart & Reavell, 2001
Potamonautes macrobrachii Bott, 1953
Potamonautes mutandensis (Chace, 1953)
Potamonautes obesus (A. Milne-Edwards, 1868)
Potamonautes parvicorpus Daniels, Stewart & Burmeister, 2001
Potamonautes parvispina Stewart, 1997
Potamonautes perlatus (H. Milne Edwards, 1837)
Potamonautes sidneyi (Rathbun, 1904)
Potamonautes unispinus Stewart & Cook, 1998
Potamonautes warreni (Calman, 1918)

Infraorder Caridea

Superfamily Alpheoidea, family Alpheidae
Alpheus architectus de Man, 1897
Alpheus bidens (Olivier, 1811)
Alpheus bisincisus De Haan, 1849 [in De Haan, 1833-1850]
Alpheus collumianus Stimpson, 1860
Alpheus deuteropus Hilgendorf, 1879
Alpheus diadema Dana, 1852
Alpheus edwardsii (Audouin, 1826)
Alpheus frontalis H. Milne Edwards, 1837 [in H. Milne Edwards, 1834-1840]
Alpheus gracilipes Stimpson, 1860
Alpheus lobidens De Haan, 1849 [in De Haan, 1833-1850] – Snapper shrimp	
Alpheus hippothoe de Man, 1888
Alpheus longecarinatus Hilgendorf, 1879
Alpheus lottini Guérin-Méneville, 1838 [in Guérin-Méneville, 1829-1838]
Alpheus malabaricus (Fabricius, 1775)
Alpheus nonalter Kensley, 1969
Alpheus notabilis Stebbing, 1915
Alpheus obesomanus Dana, 1852
Alpheus parvirostris Dana, 1852
Alpheus rapacida de Man, 1908
Alpheus rapax Fabricius, 1798
Alpheus strenuus strenuus Dana, 1852a
Alpheus sulcatus Kingsley, 1878 – Cracker shrimp	
Alpheus villosus (Olivier, 1811)
Alpheus waltervadi Kensley, 1969
Athanas djiboutensis Coutière, 1897
Athanas minikoensis Coutière, 1903
Athanas nitescens (Leach, 1813 [in Leach, 1813-1814])
Arete indicus Coutière, 1903
Betaeus jucundus Barnard, 1947 – Commensal shrimp
Racilius compressus Paul'son, 1875
Salmoneus rostratus Barnard, 1962
Synalpheus charon (Heller, 1861)
Synalpheus digueti Coutière, 1909
Synalpheus jedanensis de Man, 1909
Synalpheus tumidomanus tumidomanus (Paul'son, 1875)

Family Hippolytidae
Alope orientalis (de Man, 1890) – Oriental shrimp
Eualus cteniferus (Barnard, 1950)
Eualus makrognathus  – Not in WoRMS
Eualus pax (Stebbing, 1915)
Exhippolysmata tugelae Stebbing, 1915
Gelastocaris paronae (Nobili, 1905)
Hippolyte catagrapha d'Udekem d'Acoz, 2007 – Feather-star shrimp; Crinoid shrimp
Hippolyte kraussiana (Stimpson, 1860) – Broken backed shrimp
Hippolyte palliola Kensley, 1970
Hippolyte ventricosa H. Milne Edwards, 1837 [in H. Milne Edwards, 1834-1840]
Latreutes mucronatus (Stimpson, 1860)
Latreutes pymoeus Nobili, 1904
Lebbeus saldanhae (Barnard, 1947)
Leontocaris paulsoni Stebbing, 1905
Lysmata amboinensis (de Man, 1888) – Skunk cleaner shrimp
Lysmata debelius Bruce, 1983 – Blood shrimp
Lysmata kuekenthali (de Man, 1902)
Lysmata vittata (Stimpson, 1860)
Merhippolyte agulhasensis Spence Bate, 1888
Merhippolyte calmani Kemp & Sewell, 1912
Saron marmoratus (Olivier, 1811)
Thor amboinensis (de Man, 1888)
Tozeuma armatum Paul'son, 1875

Family Ogyrididae
Ogyrides alphaerostris (Kingsley, 1880)
Ogyrides saldanhae Barnard, 1947
Ogyrides striaticauda Kemp, 1915

Family Atyoidea, subfamily Atyidae
Caridina africana Kingsley, 1883
Caridina indistincta indistincta Calman, 1926
Caridina nilotica (Roux, 1833)
Caridina typus H. Milne Edwards, 1837 [in H. Milne Edwards, 1834-1840]

Superfamily Crangonoidea , family Crangonidae
Aegaeon cataphractus (Olivi, 1792)
Aegaeon lacazei (Gourret, 1887)
Crangon capensis Stimpson, 1860
Metacrangon bellmarleyi (Stebbing, 1914)
Parapontophilus gracilis gracilis (Smith, 1882
Parapontophilus occidentalis (Faxon, 1893)
Philocheras pilosus (Kemp, 1916)
Philocheras sculptus (Bell, 1847 [in Bell, 1844-1853])
Philocheras megalocheir Stebbing, 1915
Philocheras hendersoni (Kemp, 1915)

Family Glyphocrangonidae
Glyphocrangon dentata Barnard, 1926
Glyphocrangon longirostris (Smith, 1882)
Glyphocrangon sculpta (Smith, 1882)

Superfamily Nematocarcinoidea, family Rhynchocinetidae
Cinetorhynchus sp.
Rhynchocinetes durbanensis Gordon, 1936 – Camel shrimp

Superfamily Oplophoroidea, family Acanthephyridae
Acanthephyra acanthitelsonis Spence Bate, 1888
Acanthephyra brevirostris Smith, 1885
Acanthephyra corallina 
Acanthephyra eximia Smith, 1884
Acanthephyra pelagica (Risso, 1816)
Acanthephyra quadrispinosa Kemp, 1939
Acanthephyra stylorostratis (Spence Bate, 1888)
Acanthephyra tenuipes (Spence Bate, 1888)
Notostomus elegans A. Milne-Edwards, 1881
Meningodora mollis Smith, 1882
Hymenodora gracilis Smith, 1886

Family Oplophoridae
Janicella spinicauda (A. Milne-Edwards, 1883)
Oplophorus gracilirostris A. Milne-Edwards, 1881
Oplophorus novaezeelandiae (de Man, 1931)
Oplophorus spinosus (Brullé, 1839)
Systellaspis debilis (A.Milne-Edwards, 1881)

Superfamily Palaemonoidea, family Hymenoceridae
Hymenocera picta Dana, 1852 – Harlequin shrimp

Family Gnathophyllidae
Gnathophyllum americanum Guérin-Méneville, 1855 [in Guérin-Méneville, 1855-1856] – Zebra shrimp

Family Palaemonidae, subfamily Palaemoninae
Leander tenuicornis (Say, 1818)
Macrobrachium equidens (Dana, 1852)
Macrobrachium idea (Heller, 1862)
Macrobrachium lepidactylus (Hilgendorf, 1879)
Macrobrachium petersii (Hilgendorf, 1879)
Macrobrachium rude (Heller, 1862)
Macrobrachium scabriculum (Heller, 1862)
Macrobrachium vollenhoveni (Herklots, 1857)
Nematopalaemon tenuipes (Henderson, 1893)
Palaemon capensis (de Man in Weber, 1897)
Palaemon concinnus Dana, 1852
Palaemon debilis Dana, 1852
Palaemon elegans Rathke, 1837
Palaemon maculatus (Thallwitz, 1892)
Palaemon pacificus (Stimpson, 1860)
Palaemon peringueyi (Stebbing, 1915) – Sand shrimp

Subfamily Pontoniinae
Anchistus custos (Forskål, 1775)
Ancylomenes aesopius (Spence Bate, 1863)
Ancylomenes luteomaculatus Okuno & Bruce, 2010
Conchodytes tridacnae Peters, 1852
Coralliocaris graminea (Dana, 1852)
Cuapetes demani (Kemp, 1915)
Cuapetes grandis (Stimpson, 1860)
Cuapetes seychellensis (Borradaile, 1915)
Harpiliopsis beaupresii (Audouin, 1826)
Harpiliopsis depressa (Stimpson, 1860)
Ischnopontonia lophos (Barnard, 1962)
Jocaste lucina (Nobili, 1901)
Lipkemenes lanipes (Kemp, 1922)
Palaemonella rotumana (Borradaile, 1898)
Periclimenaeus natalensis (Stebbing, 1915
Periclimenaeus tridentatus (Miers, 1884)
Periclimenaeus uropodialis Barnard, 1958
Periclimenes brevicarpalis (Schenkel, 1902) – Snow-capped anemone shrimp
Periclimenes commensalis Borradaile, 1915
Periclimenes delagoae Barnard, 1958
Periclimenes imperator Bruce, 1967
Platycaris latirostris Holthuis, 1952

Superfamily Pandaloidea, family Pandalidae
Chlorotocus crassicornis (A. Costa, 1871)
Heterocarpus dorsalis Spence Bate, 1888
Heterocarpus laevigatus Spence Bate, 1888
Heterocarpus tricarinatus Alcock & Anderson, 1894
Heterocarpus woodmasoni Alcock, 1901
Pandalina brevirostris (Rathke, 1843)
Plesionika acanthonotus (Smith, 1882)
Plesionika edwardsii (Brandt, 1851)
Plesionika martia (A. Milne-Edwards, 1883)
Stylopandalus richardi (Coutière, 1905)

Superfamily Pasiphaeoidea family Pasiphaeidae
Leptochela (Leptochela) pugnax de Man, 1916
Leptochela (Leptochela) robusta Stimpson, 1860
Parapasiphae sulcatifrons Smith, 1884
Pasiphaea pacifica Rathbun, 1902
Pasiphaea semispinosa Holthuis, 1951

Superfamily Processoidea, family Processidae
Nikoides danae Paul'son, 1875
Processa aequimana (Paul'son, 1875)
Processa austroafricana Barnard, 1947
Processa compacta Crosnier, 1971
Processa longipes

Superfamily Stylodactyloidea, family Stylodactylidae
Parastylodactylus bimaxillaris (Spence Bate, 1888)
Stylodactylus stebbingi Hayashi & Miyake, 1968

Infraorder Gebiidea

Family Upogebiidae
Upogebia africana (Ortmann, 1894) – Estuarine mudprawn
Upogebia capensis (Krauss, 1843) – Coastal mudprawn

Infraorder Stenopodidea

Family Stenopodidae
Stenopus hispidus (Olivier, 1811) – Cleaner shrimp

Order Euphausiacea

Family Euphausiidae
Euphausia americana Hansen, 1911
Euphausia hanseni Zimmer, 1915
Euphausia lucens Hansen, 1905 – Light euphausid
Euphausia recurva Hansen, 1905
Nematoscelis megalops G.O. Sars, 1883
Nematoscelis microps G.O. Sars, 1883
Nyctiphanes capensis Hansen, 1911
Stylocheiron spp.
Thysanoessa gregaria G.O. Sars, 1883
Thysanopoda spp.

Superorder Peracarida, order Isopoda, suborder Valvifera

Family Antarcturidae
Antarcturus kladophoros Stebbing, 1908
Oxyarcturus beliaevei (Kussakin, 1967)
Pleuroprion chuni (zur Strassen, 1902)
Spinarcturus natalensis Kensley, 1978

Family Arcturidae
Astacilla brevipes (Barnard, 1920)
Astacilla corniger (Stebbing, 1873)
Astacilla lobulata (Barnard, 1925)
Astacilla longipes (Barnard, 1920)
Astacilla longispina (Kensley, 1978)
Astacilla mediterranea Koehler, 1911
Astacilla pustulata (Barnard, 1920)
Astacilla tranquilla (Kensley, 1975)
Arcturina hexagonalis Barnard, 1925
Arcturina scutula Kensley, 1975
Arcturina triangularis Barnard, 1957
Arcturinoides sexpes Kensley, 1977
Idarcturus platysoma Barnard, 1914
Microarcturus oudops (Barnard 1914a)
Microarcturus similis (Barnard 1925b)
Neastacilla bacillus (Barnard, 1920)

Family Holidoteidae
Austroarcturus africanus Kensley, 1975
Austroarcturus dayi (Kensley, 1977)
Austroarcturus foveolatus Kensley, 1975
Austroarcturus laevis (Kensley, 1975)
Austroarcturus quadriconus (Kensley, 1975)
Holidotea unicornis Barnard, 1920
Neoarcturus ornatus (Kensley, 1975)
Neoarcturus youngi (Kensley, 1978)

Family Holognathidae
Cleantioides natalensis (Barnard, 1925)

Family Idoteidae
Engidotea lobata (Miers, 1881)
Euidotea peronii (Milne Edwards, 1840)
Glyptidotea lichtensteini (Krauss, 1843) – Keeled isopod
Idotea indica Milne Edwards, 1840
Idotea metallica Bosc, 1802 – Metallic isopod
Idotea ziczac Barnard, 1951
Paridotea apposita Barnard, 1965
Paridotea fucicola Barnard, 1914 – Brown weed-louse
Paridotea reticulata Barnard, 1914 – Reticulate kelp louse
Paridotea rubra Barnard, 1914 – Red weed-louse
Paridotea ungulata (Pallas, 1772) – Green weed-louse
Synidotea hirtipes (Milne Edwards, 1840)
Synidotea setifer Barnard, 1914
Synidotea variegata Collinge, 1917

Suborder Cymothoida

Superfamily Anthuroidea, family Anthuridae
Amakusanthura africana (Barnard, 1914)
Apanthura sandalensis Stebbing, 1900
Cyathura estuaria Barnard, 1914
Haliophasma austroafricanum Kensley, 1982
Haliophasma coronicauda Barnard, 1925
Haliophasma foveolata Barnard, 1940
Haliophasma hermani Barnard, 1940
Haliophasma macrurum (Barnard, 1914)
Haliophasma pseudocarinata Barnard, 1940
Haliophasma tricarinata Barnard, 1925
Malacanthura linguicauda (Barnard, 1920)
Malacanthura ornata (Barnard, 1957)
Mesanthura catenula (Stimpson, 1855)
Notanthura caeca (Kensley, 1975)
Quantanthura serenasinus (Kensley, 1975)
Quantanthura remipes (Barnard, 1914)

Family Expanathuridae
Expanathura amstelodami (Kensley, 1976)
Panathura serricauda (Barnard, 1925)

Family Hyssuridae
Kupellonura capensis (Kensley, 1975)

Family Leptanthuridae
Accalathura indica (Nierstrasz, 1941)
Accalathura laevitelson (Kensley, 1975)
Leptanthura agulhasensis Kensley, 1975
Leptanthura laevigata (Stimpson, 1855)
Leptanthura urospinosa Kensley, 1975

Family Paranthuridae
Paranthura latipes Barnard, 1955
Paranthura punctata (Stimpson, 1855)
Pseudanthura lateralis Richardson, 1911

Superfamily Cymothooidea, family Aegidae
Aega monophthalma Johnston, 1834
Aega monilis Barnard, 1914
Aega semicarinata Miers, 1875
Aega webbii (Guérin-Méneville, 1836)
Aegapheles antillensis (Schioedte & Meinert, 1879)
Aegiochus gracilipes (Hansen, 1895)
Rocinela dumerilii (Lucas, 1849)
Rocinela granulosa Barnard, 1914
Rocinela orientalis Schioedte & Meinert, 1879
Syscenus infelix Harger, 1880

Family Cirolanidae
Cirolana fluviatilis Stebbing, 1902 	2O	
Cirolana imposita Barnard, 1955
Cirolana incisicauda Barnard, 1940
Cirolana littoralis Barnard, 1920
Cirolana luciae Barnard, 1940
Cirolana meinerti Barnard, 1920
Cirolana palifrons Barnard, 1920
Cirolana parva Hansen, 1890
Cirolana rugicauda Heller, 1861
Cirolana saldanha Barnard, 1951
Cirolana sulcata Hansen, 1890
Cirolana theleceps Barnard, 1940
Cirolana transcostata Barnard, 1959
Cirolana undulata Barnard, 1914 – Crimped cirolanid
Cirolana venusticauda Stebbing, 1902
Conilorpheus Conilorpheus blandus	Barnard, 1955
Conilorpheus scutifrons Stebbing, 1908
Eurydice barnardi Bruce & Soares, 1996 	2O	
Eurydice kensleyi Bruce & Soares, 1996 	2O	Right-angled beach louse
Eurydice longicornis (Studer, 1883)
Excirolana latipes (Barnard, 1914) Wide-foot beach louse	
Excirolana natalensis (Vanhöffen, 1914) Natal beach louse
Gnatholana mandibularis Barnard, 1920
Metacirolana bicornis (Kensley, 1978)
Natatolana borealis (Lilljeborg, 1851) Lilljeborg, 1851
Natatolana hirtipes (H. Milne Edwards, 1840) Hairy legged cirolanid	
Natatolana natalensis (Barnard, 1940)
Natatolana pilula (Barnard, 1955)
Natatolana virilis (Barnard, 1940)
Parabathynomus natalensis Barnard, 1924
Politolana obtusispina (Kensley, 1975)

family Corallanidae
Corallana africana Barnard, 1914
Corallana furcilla Barnard, 1955
Lanocira gardineri Stebbing, 1904
Lanocira latifrons Stebbing, 1910

Family Cymothoidae 
Anilocra capensis Leach, 1818 – Fish louse
Anilocra leptosoma Bleeker, 1857 	Kensley, 1978
Cinusa tetrodontis Schioedte & Meinert, 1884
Ceratothoa imbricata (Fabricius, 1775)
Cymothoa borbonica Schioedte & Meinert, 1884 – Fish tongue louse
Elthusa raynaudii (H. Milne Edwards, 1840)
Mothocya melanosticta (Schioedte & Meinert, 1884)
Nerocila orbignyi (Guérin-Méneville, 1832)
Nerocila phaiopleura Bleeker, 1857
Nerocila serra Schioedte & Meinert, 1881
Nerocila trichiura (Miers, 1877)

Family Gnathiidae
Gnathia africana Barnard, 1914
Gnathia cryptopais Barnard, 1925
Gnathia disjuncta Barnard, 1920
Gnathia spongicola Barnard, 1920

Suborder Limnoriidea

Superfamily Limnorioidea; family Limnoriidae
Limnoria quadripunctata Holthuis, 1949

Suborder Sphaeromatidea

Superfamily Seroloidea, family Bathynataliidae
Bathynatalia gilchristi Barnard, 1957

Family Serolidae
Caecoserolis brinki (Kensley, 1978)

Superfamily Sphaeromatoidea, family Ancinidae
Bathycopea typhlops Tattersall, 1905

Family Sphaeromatidae
Artopoles capensis Barnard, 1955
Artopoles natalis Barnard, 1920
Cassidias africana Barnard, 1920
Cassidinidea monodi (Barnard, 1951)
Cilicaea latreillei Leach, 1818
Cymodoce acanthiger Barnard, 1914
Cymodoce africana Barnard, 1914
Cymodoce alia Kensley, 1975
Cymodoce alis Barnard, 1955
Cymodoce amplifrons (Stebbing, 1902)
Cymodoce cavicola Barnard, 1920
Cymodoce comans Barnard, 1914
Cymodoce cryptodoma Barnard, 1920
Cymodoce excavans Barnard, 1920
Cymodoce falcata Barnard, 1920
Cymodoce lis Barnard, 1955
Cymodoce natalensis Barnard, 1920
Cymodoce radiata Barnard, 1920
Cymodoce setulosa (Stebbing, 1902)
Cymodoce tetrahele Barnard, 1920
Cymodoce tuberculata Costa in Hope, 1851
Cymodoce umbonata Barnard, 1914
Cymodoce uncinata Stebbing, 1902
Cymodoce unguiculata Barnard, 1914
Cymodoce valida (Stebbing, 1902) – Hump-tailed isopod
Cymodoce velutina Kensley, 1975
Cymodoce zanzibarensis Stebbing, 1910
Cymodocella cancellata Barnard, 1920
Cymodocella diateichos Barnard, 1959
Cymodocella eutylos Barnard, 1954
Cymodocella magna Barnard, 1954 – Tube-tail isopod
Cymodocella pustulata Barnard 1914b
Cymodocella sublevis Barnard, 1914
Dynamenella dioxus Barnard, 1914
Dynamenella huttoni (Thomson, 1879) Roll-tail isopod
Dynamenella navicula Barnard, 1940
Dynamenella taurus Barnard, 1940
Dynoides serratisinus Barnard, 1914
Exosphaeroma antikraussi Barnard, 1940
Exosphaeroma brevitelson Barnard, 1914
Exosphaeroma estuarium Barnard, 1951
Exosphaeroma hylecoetes Barnard, 1940
Exosphaeroma kraussi Tattersall, 1913
Exosphaeroma laeviusculum (Heller, 1868)
Exosphaeroma pallidum Barnard, 1940
Exosphaeroma planum Barnard, 1914
Exosphaeroma porrectum Barnard, 1914
Exosphaeroma truncatitelson Barnard, 1940
Exosphaeroma varicolor Barnard, 1914 – Variegated spherical isopod
Ischyromene australis (Richardson, 1906)
Ischyromene bicolor (Barnard, 1914)
Ischyromene macrocephala (Krauss, 1843)
Ischyromene ovalis (Barnard, 1914)
Ischyromene scabricula (Heller, 1868)
Isocladus mimetes Barnard, 1955
Isocladus otion Barnard, 1955
Isocladus tristense (Leach, 1818)
Paracilicaea clavus Barnard, 1955
Paracilicaea mossambica Barnard, 1914
Paracilicaea teretron Barnard, 1955
Parasphaeroma prominens Stebbing, 1902
Parisocladus perforatus (H. Milne Edwards, 1840) – spike-back isopod
Parisocladus stimpsoni (Heller, 1861)
Pseudosphaeroma barnardi Monod, 1931
Sphaeramene microtylotos Barnard, 1955
Sphaeramene polytylotos Barnard, 1914 – Button isopod
Sphaeroma annandalei Stebbing 1911
Sphaeroma serratum (Fabricius, 1787)
Sphaeroma terebrans Bate, 1866
Sphaeroma walkeri Stebbing, 1905
Stathmos coronatus Barnard, 1940
Zuzara furcifer Barnard, 1920

Suborder Asellota

Superfamily Janiroidea, family Dendrotionidae
Acanthomunna spinipes (Vanhöffen, 1914)

Family Haploniscidae
Antennuloniscus dimeroceras (Barnard, 1920)

Family Ischnomesidae
Ischnomesus bacillopsis (Barnard, 1920)

Family Munnopsidae, subfamily Betamorphinae
Betamorpha fusiformis (Barnard, 1920)

Subfamily Eurycopinae
Eurycope glabra Kensley, 1978
Eurycope quadrata Barnard, 1920
Munnopsurus mimus Barnard, 1914
Tytthocope sulcifrons (Barnard, 1920)

Subfamily Ilyarachninae
Ilyarachna affinis Barnard, 1920
Ilyarachna crassiceps Barnard, 1920
Ilyarachna wolffi Kensley, 1978

Subfamily Syneurycopinae
Syneurycope capensis (Barnard, 1920)

Family Santiidae
Santia uncinata (Vanhöffen, 1914)
Kuphomunna rostrata Barnard, 1914

Family Joeropsididae
Joeropsis beuroisi Kensley, 1975
Joeropsis curvicornis (Nicolet, 1849)
Joeropsis paulensis Vanhöffen, 1914
Joeropsis stebbingi Kensley, 1975 – Stebbing's isopod
Joeropsis waltervadi Kensley, 1975

Family Janiridae
Ectias angusta (Barnard, 1920)
Iais pubescens (Dana, 1852)
Ianiropsis palpalis Barnard, 1914
Iathrippa bisbidens (Barnard, 1955)
Iathrippa capensis (Barnard, 1914) – Hairy isopod
Janira falcifera Barnard, 1962
Neojaera pusilla (Barnard, 1925)
Neojaera serrata (Barnard, 1914)

Family Macrostylidae
Macrostylis spiniceps Barnard, 1920

Family Munnidae
Munna concavifrons (Barnard, 1920)

Family Munnopsidae, subfamily Munnopsinae
Munnopsis beddardi (Tattersall, 1905)
Munnopsis bispinosus Kensley, 1977
Uromunna sheltoni (Kensley, 1977)

Family Paramunnidae
Paramunna capensis Vanhöffen, 1914
Pleurosignum capensis Kensley, 1977

Superfamily Janiroidea incertae sedis
Tole extans (Barnard, 1914)

Suborder Asellota

Superfamily Stenetrioidea, family Pseudojaniridae
Pseudojanira stenetrioides Barnard, 1925

Family Stenetriidae
Protallocoxa abyssale (Wolff, 1962)
Stenetrium bartholomei Barnard, 1940
Stenetrium crassimanus Barnard, 1914
Stenetrium dagama Barnard, 1920
Stenetrium dalmeida Barnard, 1920
Stenetrium diazi Barnard, 1920
Stenetrium saldanha Barnard, 1920
Stenobermuda syzygus (Barnard, 1940)

Suborder Cymothoida, infraorder Epicaridea

Superfamily Bopyroidea, family Bopyridae, subfamily Argeiinae
Argeiopsis inhacae Kensley, 1974

Subfamily Athelginae
Athelges caudalis Barnard, 1955
Pseudostegias mossambica (Barnard, 1958)

Subfamily Bopyrinae
Parabopyrella hodgarti (Chopra, 1923)

Subfamily Hemiarthrinae
Hemiarthrus nematocarcini Stebbing, 1914
Miophrixus latreutidis Barnard, 1955

Subfamily Keponinae
Scyracepon levis Barnard, 1940

Subfamily Orbioninae
Epipenaeon fissurae Kensley, 1974
Parapenaeon japonica (Thielemann, 1910)

Subfamily Pseudioninae
Gigantione sagamiensis Shiino, 1958
Nikione natalensis Kensley, 1974
Paragigantione papillosa Barnard, 1920
Pseudione affinis (Sars G.O., 1882)
Pseudione crenulata G.O. Sars, 1898
Pseudione elongata africana Kensley, 1968

Superfamily Cryptoniscoidea, family Cabiropidae
Aegoniscus gigas Barnard, 1925
Clypeoniscus stenetrii Barnard, 1920

Family Cyproniscidae
Cyproniscus crossophori Stebbing, 1901

Suborder Oniscidea

Family Alloniscidae
Alloniscus marinus Collinge, 1920

Family Detonidae
Deto echinata Guerin, 1836 – Horned isopod

Family Ligiidae
Ligia dilatata Brandt, 1833 – Sea slater
Ligia exotica Roux, 1828 – Sea slater
Ligia glabrata Brandt, 1833 – Sea slater
Ligia natalensis Collinge, 1920 – Sea slater

Family Scyphacidae
Marioniscus spatulifrons Barnard, 1932

Family Tylidae
Tylos capensis Krauss, 1843 – Beach pill-bug
Tylos granulatus Krauss, 1843 – Giant beach pill-bug

Order Tanaidacea, suborder Tanaidomorpha

Superfamily Tanaoidea, family Tanaidae, subfamily Pancolinae, tribe Anatanaini
Zeuxo (Parazeuxo) phytalensis Sieg, 1980 – Slender tanaid	Anatanais gracilis

Order Mysida

Family Mysidae, subfamily Gastrosaccinae
Gastrosaccus bispinosus Wooldridge, 1978
Gastrosaccus longifissura Wooldridge, 1978
Gastrosaccus namibensis Wooldridge & McLachlan, 1987
Gastrosaccus psammodytes O. Tattersall, 1958 – Surf mysid

Subfamily Mysinae
Mesopodopsis africana O. Tattersall, 1952
Mesopodopsis major  – Kelp mysid
Mesopodopsis wooldridgei Wittmann, 1992

Subclass Phyllocarida

Superorder Leptostraca, order Nebaliacea

Family Nebaliidae
Nebalia capensis Barnard, 1914 – Cape leaf shrimp

Subclass Hoplocarida

Order Stomatopoda, suborder Unipeltata

Superfamily Gonodactyloidea. family Gonodactylidae
Gonodactylaceus falcatus (Forskål, 1775) – Sickle mantis shrimp
Gonodactylellus lanchesteri (Manning, 1967)
Gonodactylus chiragra (Fabricius, 1781)

Family Odontodactylidae
Odontodactylus scyllarus (Linnaeus, 1758) – Peacock mantis shrimp

Superfamily Lysiosquilloidea, family Lysiosquillidae
Lysiosquilla capensis Hansen, 1895

Superfamily Squilloidea, family Squillidae
Harpiosquilla harpax (de Haan, 1844)
Pterygosquilla capensis Manning, 1969 – Cape mantis shrimp

Class Ostracoda  

Ostracoda spp, – Seed shrimps

Extras
Pseudodiaptomus charteri  Grindley 1963
Pseudodiaptomus hessei Mrázek 1894 
Pseudodiaptomus nudus Tanaka 1960

Notes

References

Marine biodiversity of South Africa
South Africa, marine
crustaceans